Greece national water polo team may refer to:

 Greece men's national water polo team
 Greece women's national water polo team